Canğäli ( Jenalej, ; ;  Yenaley Shugurov) (died 1616) was a Tatar nobleman, the leader of the Canğäli movement in 1615–16 against Russia. In 1616 he was caught and killed in Kazan by Russian troops.

References

Tatar dukes and mirzas
History of Tatarstan
1616 deaths
Year of birth unknown